is a city in Iwate Prefecture, Japan. , the city had an estimated population of 94,691, and a population density of 100 persons per km², in 37,773 households. Hanamaki is famous as the birthplace of Kenji Miyazawa and for its hot spring resorts.

Geography
Hanamaki is located in central Iwate Prefecture, in the Kitakami River valley at the conflux of three rivers with the Kitakami River; the Sarugaishi-gawa from the east and the Se-gawa and Toyosawa-gawa from the west. The largest reservoir is Lake Tase on the Sarugaishi River. Lake Hayachine on the Hienuki River is quite spectacular with steep mountains rising above it. Lake Toyosawa is in the western part of the city on the Toyosawa River. Parts of the city are within the borders of the Hayachine Quasi-National Park. A chain of 12 hot springs that lie along the edge of the Ōu Mountains form the Hanamaki Onsenkyo Village.

Neighboring municipalities
Iwate Prefecture
Morioka
Kitakami
Tōno
Ōshū
Miyako
Nishiwaga
Shizukuishi
Shiwa

Climate
Hanamaki has a humid climate (Köppen climate classification Cfa) characterized by mild summers and cold winters.

Demographics
Per Japanese census data, the population of Hanamaki peaked at around the year 2000 and has declined since.

History
The area of present-day Hanamaki was part of ancient Mutsu Province, and has been settled since at least the Jōmon period. During the Sengoku period, the area was dominated by various samurai clans before coming under the control of the Nambu clan during the Edo period, who ruled Morioka Domain under the Tokugawa shogunate. The town developed as a post station on the Ōshū Kaidō highway during the Edo period.

In the Meiji period, with the establishment of the modern municipalities system on April 1, 1889, the modern towns of Hanamaki and Hanamaki-Kawaguchi were created within Hienuki District, Iwate. The two towns were merged on April 10, 1929, with the merged municipality retaining the name of Hanamaki. On April 1, 1954, the villages of Yuguchi, Yumoto, Miyanome, Yasawa and Ohta were annexed by Hanamaki. An additional village, Sasama, joined the following year.

In January 2006, Hanamaki merged with the towns of Ishidoriya, Ōhasama, thus dissolving Hienuki District, and with the town of Tōwa from Waga District.

Government
Hanamaki has a mayor-council form of government with a directly elected mayor and a unicameral city legislature of 25 members. Hanamaki contributes four seats to the Iwate Prefectural legislature. In terms of national politics, the city is part of Iwate 3rd district of the lower house of the Diet of Japan.

Economy
Agriculture, notably dairy farming dominates the local economy. Hanamaki is also noted for electrical appliances. The area is also noted for its many onsen (hot spring) resorts.

Education
Fuji University, a private university, is located in Hanamaki.

The city government operates 19 public elementary schools and 11 public junior high schools. There are seven public high schools operated by the Iwate Prefectural Board of Education. The prefecture also operates one special education school.

Transportation

Railway
 East Japan Railway Company (JR East) - Tōhoku Shinkansen
 
 East Japan Railway Company (JR East) - Tōhoku Main Line
  -  - 
 East Japan Railway Company (JR East) - Kamaishi Line
  -  -  -

Highway
  – Hanamaki Parking Area – Hanamaki-minami Interchange – Hanamaki Junction – Hanamaki Interchange
  – Hanamaki Junction – Hanamaki Airport Interchange – Tōwa Interchange

Airport
Hanamaki Airport

Local attractions
Hanamaki is known historically for its many onsen (hot springs). Kenji Miyazawa's various legacies are the old Hanamaki city's other perennial tourist attraction. The city also has a ski slope.

One of Hanamaki's most notable events is the Hanamaki Matsuri, an annual festival which takes place the second weekend of September and dates back to 1593.  The three-day festivities include a dance of over one thousand synchronized traditional dancers; the carrying of over one hundred small shrines; and the parading of a dozen or so large, hand-constructed floats depicting historical, fictional, or mythical scenes and accompanied by drummers, flautists, and lantern-carriers. Of these dances, the most famous is Shishi Odori (dance of the deer). This dance involves men dressing as deer and banging drums.

With the city's recent mergers, Hanamaki now lays claim to its absorbed towns' attractions.  Ōhasama is famous for local varieties of traditional Kagura dance. Kagura dancers often appear at area festivals or functions. On a hill above the town of Ōhasama proper stands a statue resembling the wolf-like costumes donned by Hayachine Kagura dancers.  Mt. Hayachine, which at 1917 m (6289 ft) is the second highest mountain in Iwate Prefecture, lies in the northeast section of Ōhasama.  The area is home to the regionally well-known Edel Wine. In September, the Ōhasama Wine House hosts the annual Wine Festival.  Around the time of Japan's Girls' Festival, Ōhasama puts on displays of its collection of dolls, many of which are several hundred years old. Local history suggests that the dolls may have been given to residents of Ōhasama by travelers from Kyoto on their way to trade in Hokkaidō.  Ishidoriya has a history of brewing sake connected with the Nambu Toji tradition.

International relations
 – Rutland, Vermont, United States, since October 8, 1986
 – Hot Springs, Arkansas, United States, since January 15, 1993
 - Berndorf, Austria since 1965. 
 - Xigang District, Dalian, Liaoning, China  - friendship city since 2010

Each of the former towns merged with Hanamaki also conducted exchanges on their own, most of which have been taken up by the new Hanamaki city.  Ōhasama was paired Berndorf. Mt. Hayachine is home to a particular species of edelweiss, called Hayachine Usuyukiso, which grows exclusively on Mt. Hayachine. It was because of this flower that mountain climbers from Ōhasama forged a friendship with those from Berndorf, Lower Austria.  Ishidoriya was paired with Rutland, Vermont.

Notable people from Hanamaki 
Koi Ikeno, manga artist 
Masanori Ito (music critic)
El Samurai, professional wrestler 
Shunkichi Kikuchi, photographer 
Kazuhiro Hatakeyama, professional baseball player 
Tetsugoro Yorozu, painter 
Kenji Miyazawa, writer
Shohei Ohtani, Professional Baseball Player

References

External links

 
 Official Website 

 
Cities in Iwate Prefecture